Joseph Mathew Alexander Morrow (born December 9, 1992) is a Canadian professional ice hockey defenceman who is currently playing for HC Davos of the National League (NL). Morrow played junior hockey with the Portland Winterhawks of the Western Hockey League. He was drafted 23rd overall by the Pittsburgh Penguins in the 2011 NHL Entry Draft. In the NHL, Morrow played for the Boston Bruins, Montreal Canadiens, Winnipeg Jets, and New Jersey Devils.

Playing career

Morrow played four full seasons of junior hockey in the Western Hockey League with the Portland Winterhawks. After the 2011–12 season, Morrow was named to the WHL's First All-Star Team, and had finished second in league scoring among all defencemen. He was drafted in the first round, 23rd overall, by the Pittsburgh Penguins at the 2011 NHL Entry Draft. He was then subsequently signed to a three-year entry level contract with the Penguins on August 3, 2011.

In his first professional season in 2012–13, Morrow was assigned directly to the Penguins American Hockey League affiliate, the Wilkes-Barre/Scranton Penguins, due to the ongoing NHL lock-out. After commencement to the shortened NHL season, Morrow received his first NHL recall to Pittsburgh but did not debut, as a precautionary injury replacement for Kris Letang, on February 10, 2013.

On March 24, 2013, Morrow was traded from the Penguins along with a fifth round draft pick in the 2013 NHL Entry Draft to the Dallas Stars in exchange for Brenden Morrow (no relation) and a third round draft pick in the same draft. On July 4, 2013, Morrow's tenure with Dallas was cut short as he was again involved in a trade between the Stars and the Boston Bruins. Boston traded Tyler Seguin, Rich Peverley, and Ryan Button; in exchange, they acquired Morrow, Loui Eriksson, Reilly Smith, and Matt Fraser.

He played 33 games during the 2015–16 season and then re-signed with the Bruins to a one-year, one-way deal for $800,000.

On July 1, 2017, Morrow signed as a free agent to a one-year contract with the Montreal Canadiens In the 2017–18 season, Morrow stuck with the Canadiens out of training camp. Despite Montreal dwindling in the standings, Morrow contributed with his best season performance in recording 5 goals and 11 points in 38 games. He was later traded on February 26, 2018, the day of the trade deadline, to the Winnipeg Jets for a fourth-round draft pick in 2018. Morrow scored his first career playoff goal during Game 1 of the 2018 Stanley Cup playoffs in the Jets' first round series against the Minnesota Wild.

On June 25, 2019, for a second consecutive season Morrow was not tendered a qualifying offer by the Jets, releasing him as a free agent. In going unsigned over the summer, Morrow was invited to attend the New York Rangers training camp on a professional tryout basis on September 12, 2019. At the conclusion of camp, Morrow was released by the Rangers on September 24, 2019.

With the 2019–20 season underway, on October 6, 2019, Morrow signed a one-year, two-way deal with the New Jersey Devils. On December 15, Morrow and the Devils mutually terminated the contract. On December 16, Morrow signed a two-year deal with Dinamo Minsk of the Kontinental Hockey League (KHL). In 22 appearances with Minsk, Morrow added just 3 assists, unable to help propel the club into the post-season.

On July 15, 2020, Morrow agreed to a mutual termination of the remaining year of his contract with Dinamo Minsk, releasing him as a free agent.
In 2021, Morrow signed a contract with the Finnish Liiga team, Porin Ässät. He returned to the KHL with Barys Nur-Sultan for the 2021–22 season, participating in the playoffs despite the exit of many North American-born players and two of the KHL's non-Russia-based teams due to the 2022 Russian invasion of Ukraine.

As a free agent in the following off-season, Morrow was signed to a one-year contract to continue in the KHL with HC Sochi on July 7, 2022.

Personal life
Morrow was born in Edmonton, Alberta, but grew up in Sherwood Park, Alberta. Morrow comes from an ice hockey family, with his father, Dave, spending time with the Indianapolis Racers of the World Hockey Association (WHA). Dave Morrow was selected by the Vancouver Canucks in the 1977 NHL amateur draft, but never played with the team. In the 2002 NHL Entry Draft his older brother, Josh, was selected 203rd overall by the Nashville Predators.

Career statistics

References

External links
 

1992 births
Living people
Ässät players
Barys Nur-Sultan players
Binghamton Devils players
Boston Bruins players
Canadian ice hockey defencemen
HC Davos players
HC Dinamo Minsk players
Montreal Canadiens players
National Hockey League first-round draft picks
People from Sherwood Park
Portland Winterhawks players
Pittsburgh Penguins draft picks
Providence Bruins players
Ice hockey people from Edmonton
HC Sochi players
Texas Stars players
Wilkes-Barre/Scranton Penguins players
Winnipeg Jets players